Bruno II can also refer to Bruno II von Berg.

Bruno II (1024–1057) was a Frisian count or margrave ruling Middle-Friesland.  He belonged to the Brunonen family.  In 1038 he succeeded his father Liudolf, Margrave of Frisia.  His mother was Gertrude the daughter of Count Hugo and brother of  Pope Leo IX.  When he was killed in 1057 in an encounter with Otto, Margrave of the Nordmark, he was succeeded by his brother Egbert.

Counts of Frisia
1024 births
Brunonids
Counts of Brunswick
1057 deaths